Gaidis Bērziņš (born 20 October 1970 in Riga) is a Latvian politician, lawyer, and university lecturer in law.  He is former Minister for Justice of Latvia and co-chair of the National Alliance, along with Raivis Dzintars.

Politics 
After the 2006 election, he was appointed the Minister for Justice, taking the office on 7 November 2006 and holding it until 12 March 2009.  Bērziņš was elected to the 2010 election as one of two For Fatherland and Freedom/LNNK representatives on the joint National Alliance list that the party shared with All For Latvia!.  When the National Alliance became a unitary party, Bērziņš became co-chair, along with Raivis Dzintars.

The 2011 election saw the National Alliance gain six seats, after which the party formed a centre-right coalition with Zatlers' Reform Party, and Unity. Bērziņš was appointed Minister for Justice once again.  He took office on the 25 October 2011.

References

1970 births
Living people
Lawyers from Riga
For Fatherland and Freedom/LNNK politicians
National Alliance (Latvia) politicians
Ministers of Justice of Latvia
Deputies of the 10th Saeima
Deputies of the 11th Saeima
Deputies of the 12th Saeima
Politicians from Riga
20th-century Latvian lawyers